The New Zealand ruffe, Schedophilus huttoni, is a medusafish of the family Centrolophidae found in all southern oceans south of latitude 18°S, at depths of up to 1,000 m. Its length is up to 90 cm.

References 

Centrolophidae
Fish described in 1910